Marudi is a town in Sarawak, Malaysia.

Marudi may also refer to:

Marudi Airport, in Marudi, Malaysia
Marudi (state constituency), represented in the Sarawak State Legislative Assembly
Marudi District